The 1991–92 season was Stoke City's 85th season in the Football League and 3rd in the Third Division.

Lou Macari was appointed as Stoke City manager in June 1991 with the hope that he would be the man to bring life back into the club. He made an instant impact and Stoke were fully involved in the fight for promotion and it was very nearly achieved. Stoke reached the Football League play-offs for the first time but lost 2–1 on aggregate to Stockport County, Stoke did however beat County at Wembley in the final of the Football League Trophy. Stoke did well in terms of goalscoring with both Wayne Biggins and new signing Mark Stein scoring 20+.

Season review

League
The board appointed former Birmingham City manager Lou Macari on 18 June 1991. Macari had a glittering career at the highest level of the game. He was seen as a man who knew what was required to achieve results and he wasted no time in altering his squad. He brought in Steve Foley (£50,000 from Swindon Town), Vince Overson (£55,000 from Birmingham City), Ronnie Sinclair (£25,000 from Bristol City) and forward Mark Stein from Oxford United for what turned out to be a bargain £100,000.

From the previous season's all-time low Stoke under Macari rose to great heights in 1991–92 and reached a Wembley final for the first time since 1972. In the Third Division Stoke were in the hunt for automatic promotion all season eventually having to settle for a play-off place where they came up against Stockport County. The first leg at Edgeley Park saw County win 1–0 thanks to a free-kick from Lee Todd after Carl Beeston had been sent-off and in the second leg Stoke went behind in the first minute and despite Stein pulling one back Stoke went out 2–1 on aggregate. Despite the obvious disappointment of missing out on promotion it was a positive season for Stoke and there was high hopes that it could be the start of the club's revival.

FA Cup
Stoke again drew non-league Telford United but this time the "Bucks" gained revenge beating Stoke 2–1.

League Cup
After beating Chesterfield in the first round Stoke drew Liverpool in the second and in the first leg at Anfield almost 8,000 Stoke fans made the trip to see Stoke make a great contest and come away with a 2–2 draw. Stoke again put up a fight in the second leg but went out of the competition losing 3–2.

League Trophy
After qualifying from their group which included Birmingham City and Walsall, Stoke then advanced past Cardiff City, Walsall (for a second time), Leyton Orient and Peterborough United with Paul Ware scoring the vital goal to send Stoke through to Wembley. In the final against Stockport County a single goal from Mark Stein gave Stoke a 1–0 victory.

Final league table

Results

Legend

Football League Third Division

Third Division play-offs

FA Cup

League Cup

League Trophy

Isle of Man Trophy

Friendlies

Squad statistics

References

Stoke City F.C. seasons
Stoke